Csaba is a Hungarian given name for males. Csaba is the native Hungarian name for Ernak, the youngest son of Attila the Hun.

Individuals with the given name include:

Csaba Almási (born 1966), Hungarian long jumper
Csaba Ferenc Asztalos (born 1974), Romanian politician of Hungarian ethnicity
Csaba Balog (born 1972), Hungarian footballer
Csaba Balogh (born 1987), Hungarian chess grandmaster
Csaba Bernáth (born 1979), Hungarian footballer
Csaba Csáki, Hungarian physicist
Csaba Csere, a former technical director and editor-in-chief of Car and Driver magazine
Csaba Csizmadia (born 1985), Hungarian football manager and former player
Csaba Czébely, former member of the Hungarian heavy metal band Pokolgép
Csaba Elthes (1912–1995), Hungarian fencing master
Csaba Fehér (born 1975), Hungarian footballer
Csaba Gera (born 1977), Hungarian judoka
Csaba Hende (born 1960), Hungarian politician and former Defense Minister of Hungary
Csaba Horváth (canoeist) (born 1971), Hungarian flatwater canoeist
Csaba Horváth (chemical engineer) (1930–2004), Hungarian-American chemical engineer
Csaba Hüttner (born 1971), Hungarian sprint and marathon canoer
Csaba Kuttor (born 1975), Hungarian triathlete
Csaba Köves (born 1966), Hungarian fencer
Csaba Kuzma (born 1954), Hungarian boxer
Csaba László (disambiguation), multiple people
Csaba Madar (born 1974), Hungarian footballer
Csaba Mérő (born 1979), Hungarian amateur Go player
Csaba Őry (born 1952), Hungarian politician
Csaba Pintér (born 1967), bass player of the Hungarian heavy metal band Pokolgép since 1996
Csaba Pléh (born 1945), Hungarian psychologist and linguist
Csaba Regedei (born 1983), Hungarian footballer
Csaba Szatmári (born 1973), Hungarian footballer
Csaba Szatmári (footballer, born 1994), Hungarian footballer
Csaba Székely, Hungarian playwright
Csaba Szigeti, Hungarian singer, Eurovision Song Contest 1995 participant
Csaba Tabajdi (born 1952), Hungarian politician
Csaba Vastag (born 1982), Hungarian musician and X-Faktor 2010 winner

References

See also

Hungarian masculine given names